Intention Surpassed is the second Defecation album, released in 2003 on Nuclear Blast Records. Unlike the debut album, this release does not feature any contribution from Mick Harris, rather Mitch Harris performed all instruments and vocals on his own.

Track listing
Continuum (1:28)
Worldly Whys (2:51)
Fibre Optical Illusion (3:05)
Fever Pitch (3:14)
2/3 Pure (2:58)
Under Surveillance (3:13)
Cryonically Preserved (3:25)
Overself (2:56)
Protective Rage (2:36)
Granted Wish (3:05)
Shortfall (3:00)
Incline (3:12)
Time Folding Machine (3:54)

Credits
Mitch Harris - Guitar, Bass, Drums, Vocals

Defecation (band) albums
2003 albums